NGC 5422 is a lenticular galaxy located in the constellation Ursa Major. It was discovered on April 14, 1789 by the astronomer William Herschel.

At a distance of about 100 million light-years (30 megaparsecs), NGC 5422 is located within the sparse NGC 5485 group, which is dominated by lenticular galaxies. It has only a single, thick, disk component. Like other galaxies in the group, it has no recent star formation, as its stellar disk is relatively old (about 10 billion years old). Its disk appears similar to the face-on galaxy NGC 6340, but appears edge-on.

References

External links 
 

Ursa Major (constellation)
5422
Unbarred lenticular galaxies